Coalpit Heath railway station served the village of Coalpit Heath, South Gloucestershire, England from 1903 to 1961 on the South Wales Main Line.

History 
The station opened on 1 July 1903 by the Great Western Railway. The station was closed to both passengers and goods traffic on 3 April 1961.

References

External links 

Former Great Western Railway stations
Railway stations in Great Britain opened in 1903
Railway stations in Great Britain closed in 1961
1903 establishments in England
1961 disestablishments in England